Emmanuel Magnien (born 7 May 1971) is a French former cyclist, who was professional from 1993 to 2003. Before he turned professional, he took part in the 1992 Olympics in Barcelona.

Some of his notable victories are the Tour de l'Avenir (1995), Tour Méditerranéen (1997), Grand Prix d'Ouverture La Marseillaise (2000), and Paris–Brussels (2001).

Major results

Road

1993
 1st Overall Tour de l'Ain
1st Stage 1
 1st Prologue Tour de l'Avenir
 1st Stage 3 Tour du Vaucluse
 5th Overall Four Days of Dunkirk
 7th Overall Tour de l'Oise
 9th Giro dell'Emilia
 9th Trophée des Grimpeurs
1994
 1st Stages 2 & 4 Critérium du Dauphiné Libéré
 1st Overall Tour d'Armorique
 1st Stages 1 & 2
 1st Stage 11 (ITT) Tour de l'Avenir
 3rd Overall Tour de l'Oise
1st Stages 1 & 3
 3rd Rund um den Henninger Turm
 5th Overall Four Days of Dunkirk
1st Stage 6
1995
 1st  Overall Tour de l'Avenir
1st Prologue & Stages 2, 9 & 11
 1st Duo Normand (with Stéphane Pétilleau)
 1st Stages 5 & 6 Tour du Poitou-Charentes
 1st Stage 3 Mi-Août Bretonne
 2nd Overall Tour de Luxembourg
 2nd Trophée des Grimpeurs
 5th Coppa Placci
 7th Coppa Sabatini
1996
 1st Stage 4 Vuelta a Aragón
 3rd GP de Denain
 4th Grand Prix d'Isbergues
 7th Amstel Gold Race
1997
 1st Overall Tour Méditerranéen 
 1st Stage 4 Étoile de Bessèges
 6th Overall Giro di Puglia
 6th Tour du Haut Var
 7th Coppa Sabatini
 9th Classic Haribo
 10th Overall Three Days of De Panne
 10th Kuurne–Brussels–Kuurne
1998
 1st Coppa Sabatini
 1st Polymultipliée de l'Hautil
 2nd Milan–San Remo
 2nd Overall Three Days of De Panne
 3rd Kuurne–Brussels–Kuurne
 3rd Tour du Haut Var
 4th Tour of Flanders
 4th Milano–Torino
 4th Paris–Brussels
 5th Overall Critérium International
1st Stage 1
 10th Giro di Romagna
 10th Paris–Bourges
1999
 5th Veenendaal–Veenendaal
 6th Overall Three Days of De Panne
 6th GP de la Ville de Villers
 10th Trophée des Grimpeurs
2000
 1st Grand Prix d'Ouverture La Marseillaise
 8th Tour du Haut Var
 9th Grand Prix d'Isbergues
 10th Overall Tour Down Under
2001
 1st Paris–Brussels
 5th Tour de Vendée
 10th GP de Villers-Cotterêts
2002
 8th Grand Prix de la Ville de Lillers
2003
 1st Stage 2 Tour Méditerranéen
 2nd GP de Villers-Cotterêts
 10th Dwars door Vlaanderen

Grand Tour general classification results timeline

Cyclo-cross

1987–1988
 1st  National Junior Championships
1988–1989
 1st  National Junior Championships
 2nd  UCI Junior World Championships
1990–1991
 1st  National Under-23 Championships
 1st Cyclo-cross de Lanarvily
1991–1992
 3rd National Championships
 4th UCI Amateur World Championships
1992–1993
 2nd National Championships
1993–1994
 1st Grand Prix Adrie van der Poel
 1st Cyclo-cross de Dijon
1994–1995
 1st Overall Challenge la France
 3rd National Championships
 10th UCI World Championships
1995–1996
 1st  National Championships
 6th UCI World Championships
1997–1998
 1st Lutterbach
 3rd National Championships
 6th UCI World Championships
1998–1999
 2nd National Championships
2001–2002
 1st Aixe-sur-Vienne
 1st Camors
 1st Tours-Île Aucard (with Cyril Lemoine)
 1st Contres (with Cyril Lemoine)
2003–2004
 1st Sablé-sur-Sarthe

References

External links 
 
 

1971 births
Living people
French male cyclists
Olympic cyclists of France
Cyclists at the 1992 Summer Olympics
Cyclo-cross cyclists
People from Sedan, Ardennes
Cyclists from Grand Est
Sportspeople from Ardennes (department)